is a Japanese politician serving in the House of Representatives in the Diet (national legislature) as a member of the Democratic Party for the People.

Overview 
A native of Hachinohe, Aomori and graduate of Tamagawa Gakugn Junior College for Women she was elected for the first time in 2003 after an unsuccessful run in 2000. Her father is Masami Tanabu, a member of House of Councilors.

References

External links 
    Official website in Japanese.

Members of the House of Representatives (Japan)
Female members of the House of Representatives (Japan)
People from Hachinohe
Living people
1963 births
Democratic Party of Japan politicians
21st-century Japanese politicians
21st-century Japanese women politicians